This is a list of Italian football transfers for co-ownership resolutions, for the 2011–12 season, from and to Serie A and Serie B.

According to Article 102 bis of NOIF (Norme Organizzative Interne della F.I.G.C). The co-ownership deal must be confirmed each year. The deal may expired, renewed, bought back or sold outright. Deals that failed to form an agreement after the deadline, will be defined by auction between the 2 clubs. Which the club will submit their bid in a sealed envelope. Non-submission (N.D. in the list) may lead to the rights is free to give to the opposite side. The mother club could sell their rights to third parties, likes Emiliano Viviano in 2010.

The deadline of 2011 window would be at 19:00 on 24 June 2011, Friday.

Co-ownership

References
General
 
 
 
Specific

Italy
2011 in Italian sport
2011